Guindulman, officially the Municipality of Guindulman,  is a 4th class municipality in the province of Bohol, Philippines. According to the 2020 census, it has a population of 34,104 people.

It is bounded by Duero to the southwest, Pilar to the northwest, Candijay to the north, Anda in the east, and the Bohol Sea to the south. Guindulman celebrates its feast on the first Saturday of September, to honor the town patron Our Lady of Consolation.

Etymology

In the olden days, names of certain places were sometimes ascribed to some usual or common incidents or occurrences as is the case with the town of Guindulman. The place was originally called Guinduluman, from a vernacular expression which means "something or somebody who is overtaken by darkness".

There is no official record to show how the town really got its name. However, folklore has it that during the early part of the Spanish era in the Philippines, there were only two formally organized towns along the southeastern and eastern coastal borders of Bohol, namely, Jagna and Batuanan (now known as Alicia). Because of the distances, travelers starting from either of these towns in the early morning were sure to be overtaken by nightfall before reaching the next place; hence the name "guinduluman".

Folklore further says that the early condition of the area itself had something to contribute to the appropriateness of the term because the center of the town was once surrounded and almost entirely shaded by a dense forest which also made the town dark even during daytime. Travelers from other places passing through this thick forest could observe its surrounding darkness because the sunlight could hardly penetrate through the thick foliage, thus causing darkness in the area at any time of the day. Such actual condition of the particular place, therefore, gave added significance to the created name.

History

It is hard to fix a definite date when this town was established as official records were destroyed during the war. However, Francisca Libres Piezas cited in her compilation that the town of Guindulman was already established before the Tamblot Rebellion of 1622. So Guindulman may now be almost 400 years old.

During the Philippine revolution against the Spanish government, there was no fighting in town reported. The people were submissive to the Spanish authorities.

Guindulman was burned down during the Philippine–American War in 1899. Guerrilla warfare was already resorted to by the local insurgents known as "insurectos". A resistance movement was organized under the leadership of Colonel Pedro Samson whose headquarters was in Monte Verde in the upper part of the town. There was no battle fought in the poblacion of Guindulman, but a memorable encounter took place in the barrio of Cabantian wherein both sides suffer heavy casualties.

The historical incident happened when American troops passed by the barrio of Cabantian, the "insurectos" ambushed the troops by jumping from the hilltops and killing many American soldiers with their bolos. However, because of the superiority of American weapons, the insurgents likewise suffered several casualties. On account of such incident, the furious American patrols then burned the houses of the particular village including the rice stocks in the fields. Still dissatisfied, they shot cows and carabaos on sight.

During the Japanese occupation in 1944, another similar encounter occurred between the Japanese troops and members of the guerrilla unit which was organized by the Major Esteban Bernido, native of Guindulman who also became a representative of the 3rd Congressional district of Bohol, governor of the province, and finally occupied one of the important cabinet positions of the country. The memorable incident started with an ambush made by the guerrillas under Major Bernido right on the boundary of Guindulman and Duero in Cabantian. The Japanese suffered heavy casualties while the guerrilla unit escaped unharmed. As a reprisal, the Japanese burned the entire poblacion, leaving only the convent and the church which were occupied by their garrison.

After the burning of the entire Poblacion (town center), the displaced families residing in the area evacuated to the upper parts of the town from barangay Bulawan and Catungawan to Mayuga and boundaries of neighboring towns. Hearing the plight of the people and feeling responsible for the conflagration brought by the Japanese garrison to the locals, the guerrillas staged a mission with a goal to uplift the spirits of their own troops and the locals that support their cause. A squad of Guerillas went to retrieve a bust of the Town's patron Our Lady of Consolation in the Town's church under the shade of darkness and the shadows of huge trees that once occupied the area. They were spotted carrying the heavy sculpture going west from the church by Japanese garrison troops stationed at the nearby bell tower and fired upon. The Guerillas suffered injuries but were able to flee and successfully brought their objective back to their camp in the highlands. The Japanese troops gave no chase as they were not familiar with the terrain and the anticipation of a diversionary attack by the guerillas meant that leaving post would jeopardize the garrison defenses. Deeply religious, the mission meant a huge success to the locals and brought hope to the families that fled the Japanese occupation. A hope to which they would hold on to until the whole island of Bohol would then be liberated by American and Filipino forces in the summer of 1945.

Geography

Barangays
Guindulman comprises 19 barangays:

Climate

Demographics

Notable personalities

 Dr. Maria Fe A. Piezas, Vice Mayor
 Gina S. Kano, Fitness & Bodybuilding Professional
 Fr. Narciso Hernandez, Augustinian Recollect Priest (1827)
 Teogenes Pelegrino, Boxer representing the Philippines at the 1968 Summer Olympics

See also

 Eskaya people

Gallery

Notes

References

External links
 [ Philippine Standard Geographic Code]
 Guindulman

Municipalities of Bohol